Protoglossum is a genus of fungus in the family Cortinariaceae. Protoglossum was circumscribed by George Edward Massee in 1891.

Taxonomy 
Protoglossum niveum is the only accepted species which remains in this genus with the previous 8 subsequently being reclassified as Cortinarius species as a result of papers in 2002 and 2014.

References

External links

Cortinariaceae
Agaricales genera